Folpet is the tradename for the organic compound with the formula C6H4(CO)2NSCCl3.  It is a fungicide derived from phthalimide (C6H4(CO)2N-) and trichloromethylsulfenyl chloride.  The compound is white although commercial samples can appear brownish.  It is structurally related to Captan, which is also a trichloromethylsulfenyl-containing fungicide.

Resistance
 folpet resistance is still unheard of due to its multiple effects. However, in 2001 some degree of cross-resistance was reported in iprodione-resistant South African Botrytis cinerea on grape.

References

Fungicides
Pesticides
Sulfenamides
Imides
Trichloromethyl compounds